The 1980–81 Pittsburgh Panthers men's basketball team represented the University of Pittsburgh in the 1980–81 NCAA Division I men's basketball season. Led by first year head coach Roy Chipman, the Panthers finished with a record of 19–12. They received an automatic bid to the 1981 NCAA Division I Basketball Tournament where they lost in the second round to North Carolina.

References

Pittsburgh
Pittsburgh Panthers men's basketball seasons
Pittsburgh Pan
Pittsburgh Pan
Pittsburgh